This is a list of University of Salford people, including staff (past and present) and alumni from the University of Salford.

Notable staff

 Allan Boardman: Physics
 Ralph Darlington: Employment Relations
 Trevor Cox: Acoustic Engineering
 Garry Crawford: Cultural Sociology
 Said Faiq: Translation & Interpreting
 Neal Hazel: Criminology and Criminal Justice
 Andy Miah: Science Communication and Future Media
 Miklas Scholz: Water resources engineering
 Audrey Stuckes: Material science

Notable alumni

Academia
 Michael Atchia: Mauritian academician, former Chief and Programme Director with the United Nations Environment Programme
 Sydney Chapman: British mathematician and geophysicist
 Robert Garner: professor of political theory at the University of Leicester
 Adam Ledgeway FBA: Professor of Italian and Romance Linguistics, Chair of the Faculty of Modern and Medieval Languages and Linguistics at the University of Cambridge
 Robert Lomas: writer, business studies and science academic, Freemasonry researcher
 Susan Price: Vice-Chancellor of Leeds Beckett University

Business
 Andy Bond: former Chief Executive of Asda
 Keith Ludeman: Chief Executive of the Go-Ahead Group
 Chris Moyes: former Chief Executive of the Go-Ahead Group
 Richard Parry-Jones: former group vice president-Global Product Development, and Chief Technical Officer, Ford Motor Company
 Mohammad Hashem Pesaran: British-Iranian economist
 Mohammed Rahif Hakmi: Chairman of Armada Group
 Kamaruddin Taib: Chairman of HSBC Bank Malaysia
 Richard Tice: CEO of CLS Holdings and co-founder of Leave.EU

Media, entertainment and design

Military
 Major General William Moore CBE: 1976-79

Physiotherapy
The university has held a link for Physiotherapy with the Professional Footballers' Association since 1991. As of 2007 over 70 former professional footballers have graduated from Salford. In 2009 the PFA reported that they had 33 members undertaking the programme at the university.

Politics

Science
 Darwin Caldwell: Research Director, Italian Institute of Technology, key person in iCub project
 B. N. Suresh (Byrana Nagappa Suresh): Indian aerospace scientist; 2002 recipient of Padma Shri
 Dawn Edge, Professor of Mental Health and Inclusivity at the University of Manchester
 Nicolette Peel MBE, British midwife and an advocate for women and families with cancer in pregnancy

Sports
 Ieuan Evans: former international rugby union player for Wales
 David France: author and football historian
 Su Maozhen: assistant coach of the Chinese Olympic football team for Beijing Olympics, current head coach of U-20 national team
 Norman Whiteside: former Manchester United and Northern Ireland footballer who studied podiatry

References

Salford
University of Salford